Wreck is an EP by Swamp Terrorists, released on April 10, 1996 by Sub/Mission and Metropolis Records.

Reception
Sonic Boom gave Wreck a mixed review, saying "for the most part this album would only appeals to completists and diehard fans since all of the material exists in its original form elsewhere."

Track listing

Personnel
Adapted from the Wreck liner notes.

Swamp Terrorists
 Michael Antener (as STR) – programming, cover art
 Ane Hebeisen (as Ane H.) – lead vocals, illustrations

Additional musicians
 Andrea – additional vocals (1)
 Sascha Konietzko – programming (9)

Release history

References

External links 
 

1996 EPs
Remix EPs
Swamp Terrorists albums
Metropolis Records EPs